Moms is a Philippine television talk show broadcast by Q. Hosted by  Manilyn Reynes, Sherilyn Reyes and Lani Mercado, it premiered on November 11, 2005. The show concluded on January 16, 2009 with a total of 825 episodes.

Hosts

 Manilyn Reynes
 Sherilyn Reyes
 Lani Mercado

Accolades

References

2005 Philippine television series debuts
2009 Philippine television series endings
Filipino-language television shows
Philippine television talk shows
Q (TV network) original programming